Mirco Games was a pinball and arcade game manufacturer from Phoenix, Arizona that existed from 1969 to 1978. They were originally called Arizona Automation from 1969 to 1973 and then changed their name to Mirco in 1974 . They created the first microprocessor-based pinball table, The Spirit of '76 in 1975. They also copyrighted the name "Champion Soccer" (A Foosball Table) They first imported then from Germany, then in 1971 they started manufacturing their own.

References

External links
Company Profile - Mirco Games
Mirco Games Inc. at the Internet Pinball Machine Database

Defunct video game companies of the United States
Manufacturing companies based in Phoenix, Arizona
Pinball manufacturers